The Napier-Hastings Urban Area was defined by Statistics New Zealand (Stats NZ) as a main urban area of New Zealand that was based around the twin cities of Napier and Hastings in the Hawke's Bay Region. It was defined under the New Zealand Standard Areas Classification 1992 (NZSAC92), which has since been superseded by the Statistical Standard for Geographic Areas 2018 (SSGA18).

The urban area lay mostly on the Heretaunga Plains, with part on surrounding hills. It was a city cluster consisting of the cities of Napier and Hastings, the town of Havelock North and some smaller settlements. It was the sixth-most-populous urban area in the country under the NZSAC92, with  residents, fewer than Tauranga and more than Dunedin.

Stats NZ also subdivided the urban area into urban zones, as they did for the urban areas of Auckland, Hamilton and Wellington. The Napier-Hastings Urban Area contains about three-quarters of the population of the entire Hawke's Bay.

Under SSGA18, Stats NZ split up the Napier-Hastings Urban Area for statistical purposes. It was split into two "large urban areas" (30,000 to 99,999 population) of Napier and Hastings, the "medium urban area" (10,000 to 29,999) of Havelock North, the "small urban area" (1,000 to 9,999) of Clive, and the "rural settlements" (300 to 999) of Haumoana, Te Awanga, Whakatu and Whirinaki. Some settlements of less than 300 that were included in the Napier-Hastings Urban Area were left out entirely, including Eskdale, Omahu, Pakipaki, Pakowhai and Waiohiki. Stats NZ similarly split Wellington into Lower Hutt, Porirua, Upper Hutt and the urban part of Wellington City under SSGA18.

Urban zones

Hastings Urban Zone
Hastings Urban Zone lay within Hastings District and included Hastings, Havelock North and localities from Omahu and Pakowhai in the north, Pakipaki in the west, to settlements near the coast from Clive to Te Awanga. The main urban zone of Hastings contained around 68,000 people. Hastings hosts the regional hospital, showgrounds, racecourse, newspaper print, sports park and a water park.

Hastings on its own would have been the 8th largest urban area in New Zealand.

Napier Urban Zone
Napier Urban Zone consisted of Napier city and two parts of Hastings District that adjoin it: the Eskdale–Whirinaki area to the north and the Waiohiki area to the south. Napier hosts the region's port (the majority of export coming from Hastings' industry and food processing), airport, High Court and polytechnic college, and the regional council headquarters.

Napier on its own would have been the 10th largest urban area in New Zealand.

Amalgamation
Amalgamation is an ongoing debate for Napier and Hastings residents. Both cities have previously had smaller amalgamations (Napier absorbed Taradale, Hastings absorbed Havelock North in the local government reforms of 1989). 

There was a referendum on forming a joint Hastings and Napier in 1999, which resulted in 75% 'no' vote from Napier residents, and a 64% 'yes' vote from Hastings residents. Many say the referendum was called too early and many Napier residents were still bitter about the closing of Napier Hospital in 1998 and making Hastings Hospital the only public hospital in the region. 

A proposal in 2015 was for the new council to also absorb the Wairoa and Central Hawkes Bay councils to make a super regional council of 150,000 people. This amalgamation referendum was held in September 2015, the majority of voters (~66%) rejected the proposal in favour of the status quo.

Part of recognition of New Zealand's sixth-largest population centre is being labelled that way. Many residents have brought forth renaming the city to reflect this to the rest of the nation instead of referring to the cities by their current separate names. Names proposed include:

 Heretaunga (the name of the plains upon which both cities are situated)
 Hawkes Bay City (reflecting both recognised location and 'city' status)
 Hawke (again, coinciding with the name of the region)
 The Bay City (This perhaps is more in jest, and is already a common nickname)
 Napier-Hastings (The status quo, but still does not address the issue)

Seismicity
Hawke's Bay is one of the most seismically active regions in New Zealand, and Napier-Hastings has experienced many large earthquakes. More than 50 damaging earthquakes have rocked the area since the European colonisation in the 1800s. Some of the more notable are listed below.

Education
The Eastern Institute of Technology is based at Taradale and is the main regional tertiary education centre for the Hawke's Bay and Gisborne regions, with campuses at Taradale, Auckland and Gisborne.

References

Main urban areas in New Zealand
Populated places in the Hawke's Bay Region
Hastings, New Zealand
Napier, New Zealand